Solbjerg is a south-western suburb of Aarhus in Denmark and one of the outer suburbs of Aarhus. It is located 17 km. from the city centre and has a population of 4,240 (1 January 2022).

References

Towns and settlements in Aarhus Municipality
Cities and towns in Aarhus Municipality